How Obelix Fell into the Magic Potion When he was a Little Boy ("How Obelix Fell into the Druid's Cooking Pot When He Was Small") is an Asterix story written by René Goscinny and originally published in the French magazine Pilote issue 291 (1965), with only a few drawings. In 1989, it was fully illustrated by Albert Uderzo and published in an album as a comic book with illustrations.

Plot summary 

The story is narrated by Asterix, apparently to the conventional readers, and informs that in childhood, Obelix was often bullied by other boys, until Asterix, to help his courage, induced him to drink some of the magic potion that made the villagers invincible. When they are interrupted in the act, Obelix falls into the cauldron containing the potion, and drinks it all, and is thereafter permanently under its influence.

Notes 
 Obliscoidix (original French: Obélodalix), Obelix's father, is shown to enjoy collecting the helmets of Roman legionaries - a hobby Obelix enjoys as an adult.
 Vitalstatistix, who is a generation older than Asterix and Obelix, is already the village's young chief, albeit slimmer (similar to his appearance toward the end of Asterix and the Chieftain's Shield). In the background of one picture in the book, the silhouetted figure of a child is depicted being carried by a shield in the manner of Vitalstatistix.
 Throughout the story, Obelix is seen pulling a small white wooden toy dog that resembles Dogmatix.
 The 24-year gap between the story text and most illustrations leads to some inconsistencies between the two, and also with the rest of the Asterix stories (mostly minor and relating to the chief).
 Prior to falling into the cauldron, Obelix is shy and pacifistic - possibly because the other boys pick on him.  He gains his characteristic love of fighting after getting his own back and is also shown to have taken on some other characteristics he is well known for as an adult - at the conclusion of the story the village children enjoy a miniature banquet, in which Cacofonix is tied to a tree and gagged for the first time, and someone comments "Fat lot of good fighting you, Obelix.", to which Obelix angrily retorts "WHO ARE YOU CALLING FAT?!"

Publication 
 The book had been out of print in English for a decade but was re-released in October 2009 with a new cover.

In other languages 
 French: 
 Croatian: 
 Czech: 
 Danish: 
 Dutch: 
 Finnish: 
 Galician: 
 German: 
 Greek: Πώς ο Οβελίξ έπεσε στη χύτρα του Δρυΐδη όταν ήταν μικρός
 Italian: 
 Norwegian: 
 Polish: 
 Portuguese: 
 Serbian: Како је Обеликс упао у чаробни напитак
 Spanish: 
 Turkish:

Reception 
On Goodreads, it has a score of 3.86 out of 5.

References

External links 
Official Website

Asterix books
1989 graphic novels
Works by René Goscinny
Works originally published in Pilote